"I'll Make It All Up to You" is a song written by Charlie Rich and originally recorded by Jerry Lee Lewis, who released it as a single, with "Break-Up" on the other side, in 1958 on Sun Records.

Track listing

Charts

References 

1958 songs
1958 singles
Jerry Lee Lewis songs
Sun Records singles

Rock-and-roll songs
Songs written by Charlie Rich